The 1992 CSKA season was the club's first season in the newly formed Russian Top League, the highest tier of association football in Russia.

Season Events

Squad

Transfers

In:

Out:

Competitions

Top League

Group A

Results by round

Results

League table

Final stage

Results by round

Matches

League table

Russian Cup

1992-93

The Quarterfinal took place during the 1993 season.

UEFA Champions League

First round

Second round

Group stage

Matches 3-6 took place during the 1993 season.

Squad statistics

Appearances and goals

|-
|colspan="14"|Players who left CSKA Moscow during the season:

|}

Goal scorers

Clean sheets

Disciplinary record

References

PFC CSKA Moscow seasons
CSKA Moscow